Mason Christopher Jones (born July 21, 1998) is an American professional basketball player for the Capitanes de Ciudad de México of the NBA G League. He played college basketball for the Connors State Cowboys and the Arkansas Razorbacks.

Early life and high school career
Jones grew up in DeSoto, Texas and did not play basketball until his senior year of high school at Triple A Academy in Dallas, Texas. That year, he averaged 15.9 points, 5.7 rebounds, and 4.1 assists per game. Jones played at Link Year Prep in Branson, Missouri for a postgraduate year, trimming his weight down from 265 pounds from his senior year of high school to 230 by the end of the season.

College career
Jones played his freshman season at Connors State College. He averaged 15.5 points, 6.9 rebounds and 2.5 assists per game in his only season for the Cowboys. Jones committed to transfer to Arkansas following the end of the season over offers from BYU and Washington.

In his first season with the Razorbacks, Jones finished third on the team with 13.9 points per game and second with 3.9 rebounds per game. Jones scored 23 points to help lead Arkansas to a 70–60 over Georgia. Jones scored a season-high 30 points twice against Florida and Mississippi State.

Jones entered his junior season as the team's leading returning rebounder and the second leading scorer. Jones was named the Southeastern Conference (SEC) Player of the Week after scoring 32 points with seven rebounds and five steals in a 91–43 Rice. He scored a career-high 41 points in a 98–79 win over Tulsa on December 14, 2019 and was again named the SEC Player of the Week. Jones scored 34 points in a 79–77 loss to South Carolina on January 30, 2020 followed by a 30-point performance in a 82–78 win over Alabama two days later and was named the Player of the Week for the third time. On February 4, Jones scored 40 points in a 79–76 loss to Auburn in a game in which the Razorbacks' second-leading scorer Isaiah Joe did not play due to knee surgery. Jones became the third SEC player alongside Shaquille O'Neal and Jodie Meeks with multiple 40-point games and the first player in Arkansas history to score at least 30 points in three straight games. Jones scored 38 points in 78–77 loss to Mississippi State. Jones scored 38 points on February 26, 2020 in an 86–69 win over Tennessee and scored his 1,000th career point during the game, becoming the fifth fastest Razorback to reach the milestone and the eighth player in school history to do so in his first two seasons with the team. At the conclusion of the regular season, Jones was named First Team All-SEC and was named co-SEC Player of the Year by the Associated Press along with Reggie Perry of Mississippi State. Jones averaged 22 points, 5.5 rebounds, and 3.4 assists per game, shooting 45.3 percent from the floor. After the season, he declared for the 2020 NBA draft but did not sign with an agent.

Professional career

Houston Rockets (2020–2021)
After going undrafted in the 2020 NBA draft, Jones agreed to terms on a two-way contract with the Houston Rockets on November 26, 2020. However, he was waived on March 8, 2021. Shortly after four days, the Rockets signed Jones to a 10-day contract.

Philadelphia 76ers (2021)
On March 26, 2021, the Philadelphia 76ers announced that they had signed Jones to a two-way contract. On May 6, he was waived by the 76ers.

South Bay Lakers (2021)
On November 6, 2021, Jones signed with the South Bay Lakers of the NBA G League. In 12 games, he averaged 18.2 points (.518 FG%, .420 3FG%), 6.1 rebounds, 7.3 assists and 1.2 steals in 30.2 minutes per game.

Los Angeles Lakers (2021–2022)
On December 21, 2021, Jones signed a two-way contract with the Los Angeles Lakers.

Jones joined the Lakers' 2022 NBA Summer League roster.

Capitanes de Ciudad de México (2022–present)
On October 11, 2022, the Capitanes de Ciudad de México announced that they had acquired the returning right for Jones in a three-team trade. On October 22, 2022, Jones was included in training camp roster for the Capitanes de Ciudad de México.

Career statistics

NBA statistics

Regular season 

|-
| style="text-align:left;"| 
| style="text-align:left;"| Houston
| 26 || 1 || 11.8 || .412 || .359 || .614 || 2.0 || 1.5 || .2 || .0 || 5.8
|-
| style="text-align:left;"| 
| style="text-align:left;"| Philadelphia
| 6 || 0 || 4.5 || .556 || .500 || .714 || .7 || .5 || .2 || .0 || 2.7
|-
| style="text-align:left;"| 
| style="text-align:left;"| L.A. Lakers
| 4 || 0 || 12.8 || .467 || .250 || .800 || 2.5 || 1.0 || .5 || .0 || 6.8
|- class="sortbottom"
| style="text-align:center;" colspan="2"| Career
| 36 || 1 || 10.7 || .428 || .357 || .658 || 1.8 || 1.3 || .3 || .0 || 5.4

College

NCAA Division I

|-
| style="text-align:left;"| 2018–19
| style="text-align:left;"| Arkansas
| 34 || 26 || 29.3 || .404 || .365 || .804 || 3.9 || 2.8 || .9 || .1 || 13.6
|-
| style="text-align:left;"| 2019–20
| style="text-align:left;"| Arkansas
| 31 || 30 || 33.9 || .453 || .351 || .826 || 5.5 || 3.4 || 1.6 || .2 || 22.0
|- class="sortbottom"
| style="text-align:center;" colspan="2"| Career
| 65 || 56 || 31.5 || .431 || .358 || .819 || 4.6 || 3.1 || 1.2 || .2 || 17.6

NJCAA

|-
| style="text-align:left;"| 2017–18
| style="text-align:left;"| Connors State
| 35 || 25 || – || .515 || .429 || .774 || 6.9 || 2.5 || 1.5 || .7 || 15.5

Personal life
Jones' older brother, Matt Jones, played college basketball at Duke and has played professionally in the NBA G League and overseas.

References

External links
Arkansas Razorbacks bio
Connors State Cowboys bio

1998 births
Living people
American expatriate basketball people in Mexico
American men's basketball players
Arkansas Razorbacks men's basketball players
Basketball players from Texas
Capitanes de Ciudad de México players
Connors State Cowboys basketball players
Houston Rockets players
Los Angeles Lakers players
People from DeSoto, Texas
Philadelphia 76ers players
Shooting guards
South Bay Lakers players
Undrafted National Basketball Association players